Posse is a 1975 American Revisionist Western film in Technicolor and Panavision. It was produced and directed by Kirk Douglas who also starred. The screenplay was written by Christopher Knopf and William Roberts. The plot centers on a U.S. marshal with political ambitions leading an elite posse in pursuit of a notorious train robber to further his political career. The film premiered in New York City on June 4, 1975, and in June the same year in Berlin at the 25th Berlin International Film Festival, where Douglas was nominated for the Golden Bear.

Plot
Howard Nightingale (Douglas), a U.S. marshal, leads an elite uniformed posse to track down and capture infamous train robber Jack Strawhorn (Bruce Dern). He is doing so to further his political career, as he is running to become a U. S. Senator. When Nightingale captures Strawhorn, his election seems inevitable, but Strawhorn disrupts everything when he escapes, kidnapping Nightingale in the process. He demands a ransom of $40,000 from the posse for Nightingale's safe return—the same amount of money the posse burned when it first tracked Strawhorn down and killed the members of his gang. To raise the money, Nightingale's posse has to rob the town, thus turning the public against Nightingale. The posse members, since they first captured Strawhorn, had been given reason to doubt that their loyalty to Nightingale is reciprocated. It sets up a final confrontation where they have to reassess on whose side they are.

Cast
 Kirk Douglas as Marshal Howard Nightingale
 Bruce Dern as Jack Strawhorn
 Bo Hopkins as Wesley
 James Stacy as Hellman
 Luke Askew as Krag
 David Canary as Pensteman
 Alfonso Arau as Peppe
 Katherine Woodville as Mrs. Cooper
 Mark Roberts as Mr. Cooper
 Beth Brickell as Mrs. Ross
 Dick O'Neill as Wiley
 Bill Burton as McCanless
 Louie Elias as Rains
 Gus Greymountain as Reynolds
 Allan Warnick as The Telegrapher
 Roger Behrstock as Buwalda
 Jess Riggle as Hunsinger
 Stephanie Steele as Amy
 Melody Thomas as Laurie
 Dick Armstrong as Shanty Principal
 Larry Finley as Shanty Principal
 Pat Tobin  as Shanty Principal

See also
 List of American films of 1975

References

External links
 
 
 
 
 Sample frames of Posse from one of the cinematographers

1975 films
1975 Western (genre) films
American Western (genre) films
Films directed by Kirk Douglas
Paramount Pictures films
Bryna Productions films
United States Marshals Service in fiction
Films with screenplays by William Roberts (screenwriter)
1970s English-language films
1970s American films